Holmberg II is a dwarf galaxy in the constellation Ursa Major. Its apparent magnitude is 11,1m and it is 11 million light years away from Earth. The galaxy is dominated by huge glowing gas bubbles, which are regions of star formation.

Holmberg II also hosts an ultraluminous X-ray source. One hypothesis suggests that is caused by an intermediate mass black hole that is pulling surrounding material.

Holmberg II was discovered by Erik Bertil Holmberg.

References

External links 
 

Ursa Major (constellation)
Dwarf galaxies
268
23324
04305
M81 Group